Zbigniew Kociołek (born 21 January 1945) is a former football coach and manager.

Management career

Kociołek had a brief spell in management roles of football, firstly becoming the manager of Stoczniowiec Gdańsk. Kociołek was the assistant manager at Legia Warsaw for a season, before managing Lechia Gdańsk for a season before being sacked after relegation, and then with Wisła Płock where he led the team to a third place finish for the 1988-89 season before being sacked halfway through the next season.

Honours

Wisła Płock
III liga (group IV) third place (1): 1988–89

References

1945 births
Polish football managers
Lechia Gdańsk managers
Living people